George Heath may refer to:

 George Heath (priest) (1745–1822), Headmaster of Eton School
 George Heath (racing driver) (1862–1943), American racing driver
 George M. Heath, American scientist who developed a tuberculosis serum in 1913
 George Heath (cricketer) (1913–1994), English cricketer
 George Heath (cinematographer), Australian cinematographer
 Ted Heath (bandleader) (George Edward Heath, 1902–1969), musician and big band leader